Kalimath  is a village in Rudraprayag District of the Indian state of Uttarakhand. It is regarded as a divine place and shakti peeth.

Geography 
Kalimath is situated close to Ukhimath and Guptakashi.

It is one of the Siddha Peeths of the region and is held in high religious esteem.

Religion 
The temple of Goddess Kali there is visited by devotees year round, especially during the Navratras. This holy shrine is one of 108 Shakti Peethas in India as per Srimad Devi Bhagwat. The upper part of Kali is worshipped in Dhari Devi. The remaining part in Kalimath religious tradition is that Kalimath is where Kali killed the demon Raktavija and went under the earth. Kalimath is the only place where the goddess Kali is worshipped along with her sisters Laxmi and Saraswati.

No idol is worshipped in the temple. Instead the Sri Yantra is the object of devotion. On one day each year the goddess is taken out and Puja is performed at midnight, with only the chief priest present. Near the temple are other ancient temples to Laxmi, Saraswati, Gauri Shankar and many antique Shivlings, idols of Nandi and Ganesh, etc.

An eternal holy flame always burns in the temple of Laxmi. Bhairava Mandir is located nearby. Barti Baba is credited for preserving the sanctity of this holy shrine. All the people who met him and the locals say that he had a direct connection with Maa Kali.

The guru and Member of Parliament, Satpal Maharaj, set up a small Dharamshala near the temple where pilgrims can stay. About 2 km east is Kunjethi village, hosting two temples of Mata Manana Devi and Mankameshwar Mahadev. 6 km from Kalimath at the top of a hill there is a huge Kalishila and another one Kali Temple.

Barkha Giri Baba and Sarawati Mai lived there in a hut for many years.

Notables 
The village is the birthplace of Kalidas, a Sanskrit poet.

References 

Villages in Rudraprayag district